Neely House is a historic home located at Martinsville, Morgan County, Indiana.  It was built about 1895, and is a two-story, cruciform plan, Queen Anne style frame dwelling.  It features Stick style ornamentation and a wraparound porch.  It was restored in 1997.

It was listed on the National Register of Historic Places in 2000.  It is located in the East Washington Street Historic District.

References

Houses on the National Register of Historic Places in Indiana
Queen Anne architecture in Indiana
Houses completed in 1895
Buildings and structures in Morgan County, Indiana
National Register of Historic Places in Morgan County, Indiana
Historic district contributing properties in Indiana